The following elections occurred in the year 1947.

Africa
 Algerian municipal elections
 1946–1947 Moyen-Congo Representative Council election
 1946–47 Chadian General Council election
 1946–47 Dahomeyan General Council election
 1946–47 French Sudan General Council election
 Gabonese Representative Council election, 1946−47
 Gambian legislative election
 Guinean General Council election, 1946−47
 1946–47 Ivorian General Council election
 1946–1947 Moyen-Congo Representative Council election
 Nigerian general election
 Nigerien General Council election, 1946−47

Asia
 1947 Burmese general election
 Cambodian general election
 Ceylonese parliamentary election
 Iranian legislative election
 Japanese general election
 Japanese House of Councillors election
 Laotian parliamentary election
 Lebanese general election
 North Korean local elections
 Philippine Senate election
 Republic of China National Assembly election
 Soviet Union regional elections
 Syrian parliamentary election
 Transjordanian general election

Australia
 1947 Queensland state election
 1947 South Australian state election
 1947 Western Australian state election

Europe
 1947 Maltese general election
 1947 Norwegian local elections
 1947 Soviet Union regional elections

Denmark 
 Folketing election
 Landsting election

France
 presidential election

Germany
 Rhineland-Palatinate: state election
 Schleswig-Holstein: state election
 Lower Saxony: state election
 North Rhine-Westphalia: state election
 Saarland: state election
 Bremen: state election

Hungary
 parliamentary election

Poland
 legislative election 
 presidential election

United Kingdom
 Epsom by-election
 Gravesend by-election
 Liverpool Edge Hill by-election
 Normanton by-election

United Kingdom local

English local
 1947 Manchester Council election

Americas

North America

Canada
 1947 Edmonton municipal election
 1947 Prince Edward Island general election
 1947 Toronto municipal election
 1947 Yukon general election

Central and South America
 Bolivian general election
 Brazilian legislative election
 Colombian parliamentary election
 Ecuadorian parliamentary election
 1947 Guatemalan parliamentary election
 Nicaragua: 
 Constitutional Assembly election
 general election
 presidential election
 Venezuelan general election

See also
 :Category:1947 elections

1947
Elections